Sloat is a surname. Notable people with the surname include:

 Ann Sloat (1928–2017), Canadian politician
 Donald Sloat, Medal of Honor recipient
 John D. Sloat (1781–1867), American naval commodore who claimed California for the US
 Lefty Sloat (1918–2003), American baseball player
 Micah Sloat (b. 1981), American actor and musician
 Taylor Sloat (b. 1992), American football player